The prime minister of Montenegro, officially the president of the Government of Montenegro, is the head of the government of Montenegro. The role of the prime minister is to direct the work of the government, and to submit to the Parliament the government's program, which includes a list of proposed ministers. The resignation of the prime minister would cause the dissolution of his government.

The current prime minister, Dritan Abazović, a leader of civic political party United Reform Action, was approved by the Parliament of Montenegro on April 28, 2022, after the formation of the 43rd government of Montenegro in Cetinje.

History
The first modern Montenegrin government was established on March 20, 1879, during the Principality of Montenegro. The title of the head of government was President of the Ministerial Council (Предсједник Министарског савјета).

On August 28, 1910, Montenegro was proclaimed a kingdom. During both the principality and the kingdom, the office was of no major importance or influence but depended solely on the will of the sovereign Nikola I. After the capitulation of Montenegro to the Central Powers on January 15, 1916, during World War I, the government went into exile and remained abroad until it ceased to exist. After the decision of the Podgorica Assembly on November 26, 1918, to unify Montenegro with Serbia and the subsequent formation of the Kingdom of Serbs, Croats and Slovenes, Stojan Protić became the prime minister of the newly formed Kingdom on December 20, 1918. The deposed King Nikola I continued to appoint prime ministers of Montenegro in exile until his death in 1921. The government of Montenegro in exile ceased to exist shortly afterwards, in 1922.

Under the communist regime, Montenegro obtained its own government on March 7, 1945. On that day, a ministry for Montenegro was created within the government of Yugoslavia (as for all the other five republics), with a minister for Montenegro in charge of creating the first real government of post-war Montenegro, which took place on April 17, 1945. Governments were headed by a prime minister until February 4, 1953, by a president of the Executive Council until January 15, 1991, and again by a prime minister since then.

List of prime ministers of Montenegro

Preceding posts

Monarchy

Heads of administrations before 1945

Socialist republic

Parliamentary republic

See also
 Government of Montenegro
 Guvernadur of Montenegro
 List of heads of state of Montenegro
 President of Montenegro
 List of presidents of Montenegro

References

External links
 Prime Minister of Montenegro

Government of Montenegro
 
Montenegro, Prime Minister of
Prime Ministers
Lists of office-holders in Montenegro
1870s establishments in Montenegro